In textual criticism, an exemplar is the text used to produce another text. In the study of the history of a text an especially important exemplar is that which precedes any split in the tradition of that text, that is, before significant textual variations occur in different versions: such an exemplar is called an archetype.

Textual criticism
Biblical criticism
Philology
Textual scholarship